Greatest Hits is a compilation album by American singer/songwriter/producer Richard Marx. Released in 1997, this hits package was Marx's final release under his ten-year-long Capitol Records recording contract. It contains fourteen of his single releases, plus "Touch of Heaven", a promotional single from the 1997 album Flesh & Bone, and "Angel's Lullaby", a track that had appeared on the 1996 compilation album For Our Children, Too, released to benefit the Pediatric AIDS Foundation.

Greatest Hits was certified Silver in the United Kingdom in 2013 for sales of 60,000 copies. In 2016, the album was certified Gold by the RIAA—which represents U.S. sales of over 500,000 copies—becoming Marx's fifth American Gold album.

The album was dedicated to Dick Marx, Richard Marx's father.

Track listing
All tracks written by Richard Marx, except where noted.

The Japanese version of the album contains the bonus tracks "Slipping Away" and "Thanks to You".

Charts

Certifications

References

1997 greatest hits albums
Richard Marx albums
Albums produced by Richard Marx
Albums produced by Humberto Gatica
Albums produced by David N. Cole
Albums produced by Randy Jackson
Capitol Records compilation albums